Delta Arietis (δ Arietis, abbreviated Delta Ari, δ Ari), officially named Botein , is a star in the northern constellation of Aries, 1.8 degrees north of the ecliptic. The apparent visual magnitude is 4.35, so it is visible to the naked eye.

Nomenclature
δ Arietis (Latinised to Delta Arietis) is the star's Bayer designation.

It bore the traditional name Botein which is derived from Al Bīrūnī's Al Buṭayn (Arabic: البُطَين), the diminutive of Al Baṭn, "the Belly". This is the name of a star association consisting of this star, Epsilon Arietis, Zeta Arietis, Pi Arietis, and Rho3 Arietis According to a 1971 NASA catalogue of stars, Al Buṭain was the title for five stars: Delta Arietis (listed as Botein), Pi Arietis (as Al Buṭain I), Rho3 Arietis (Al Buṭain II), Epsilon Arietis (Al Buṭain III) and Zeta Arietis (Al Buṭain IV). In 2016, the International Astronomical Union organized a Working Group on Star Names (WGSN) to catalogue and standardize proper names for stars. The WGSN approved the name Botein for this star on 12 September 2016 and it is now so included in the List of IAU-approved Star Names.

In the catalogue of stars in the Calendarium of Al Achsasi Al Mouakket, this star was designated Nir al Botain, which was translated into Latin as Lucida Ventris, meaning "the brightest of the belly".

Properties
Delta Arietis is an evolved giant star with a stellar classification of K2 III. It belongs to a population known as red clump giants, which means it is generating energy through the fusion of helium at its core. With close to twice the mass of the Sun, the outer envelope has expanded until it is around ten times the Sun's radius. It shines with 45 times the Sun's luminosity at an effective temperature of 4,810 K, giving it the orange-hued glow of a K-type star. It is a suspected variable star that ranges in magnitude from 4.33 to 4.37.

References

External links
 HR 951
 The Constellations and Named Stars
 Image Delta Arietis

Aries (constellation)
K-type giants
Horizontal-branch stars
Botein
Arietis, Delta
Arietis, 57
0951
019787
BD+19 0477
014838